Lepidosperma chinense, also known as the Chinese scaleseed sedge, is a plant widely distributed across Fujian, Guangdong, Guangxi, Hainan, Hunan, Zhejiang, Indonesia, Malaysia, Papua New Guinea, and Vietnam.

It is common in Hong Kong.

References

Flora of China
Flora of Vietnam
Flora of Malesia
Flora of Papua New Guinea
chinense
Plants described in 1837